was a Japanese actress.

Her hobby was golf. She started work at Shochiku in 1950, and played supporting roles in some of Yasujirō Ozu's films. She was a constant in Japanese film and TV drama for half of the 20th century.

Selected filmography

Film

  (1950)
  (1950) - Oroku
  (1950)
  (1950)
  (1950)
  (1951) - Kaoko Fukuda, Namiko's sister
 Boyhood (1951) - Mrs. Yamazaki
  (1951) - Tomie Honda
 (1951)
  (1952) - Mitsuyo
  (1952) - Oryû
  (1953)
 Tokyo Story (1953) - Oden-ya no onna
  (1953) - Osugi Morikawa
  (1954) - Madame at bar
  (1954)
  (1955) - Hama Katagiri
  (1955)
  (1955) - Otsuko, second daughter
  (1956)
  (1956, part 1, 2) - Reiko
  (1956) - Omutsu
  (1956) - Sushi shop lady
  (1956)
 Tokyo Twilight (1957)
 Times of Joy and Sorrow (1957)
  (1957)
  (1958)
  (1958)
  (1958-1959, part 1, 2)
 Equinox Flower (1958) - Akemi
  (1959) - Kikutarô
 Good Morning (1959) - Oden'ya no Nyôbô
 High Teen (1959) - Tomiko, Hiroshi's mother
  (1959) - Nobuko, Miyazaki's mother
  (1959)
  (1959) - Kansuirô maid
  (1959)
  (1959) - O-Katsu
  (1960)
  (1960)
 Late Autumn (1960)
  (1960) - Orin
 Zero Focus (1961)
  (1961) - Bar's madame
  (1961, Serial) - Okane (Episode 1)
  (1962)
  (1962)
  (1962)
  (1962)
  (1965) - Maid
  (1965)
  (1966) - Kayo Kashima
  (1966) - Yoshi Okamoto
  (1966)
  (1967)
  (1968) - Kura, Chiyo's mother
  (1970) - Kane
  (1970) - Mitsuko Masuda
  (1975)
  (1975) - Boarding House Landlady
  (1983) - O-Tatsu
  (1992) - Yuki Anayama
  (1995) - Tomeno
 Give It All (1998) - Fuki Shinomura
 A Class to Remember 4: Fifteen (2000)
  (2002)
  (2004) - Tomi Furukawa
 Village Photobook (2004)
 Swing Girls (2004) - Tomoko's Grandmother (final film role)

Television
 Playgirl (1969) - Grandmother
 Mito Kōmon (1971–1985)
 Ōoka Echizen (1972–1978)
 The Water Margin (1973)
 G-Men '75 (1977)
 Princess Comet (1978–1979)
 Monkey (1978)
 Ōedo Sōsamō (1984)
 Space Sheriff Shaider (1984)

References

External links 
 https://www.imdb.com/name/nm0757299/

Japanese film actresses
1921 births
2005 deaths
20th-century Japanese actresses